Well Wishes is a 2015 American independent comedy film written and directed by Anderson Boyd and starring Shane Callahan, Anna Stromberg, Cullen Moss and Don Henderson Baker.  The film was released digitally on May 10, 2016 and began streaming on Netflix in the United States, Canada, France, United Kingdom, Italy, and Japan on July 1, 2016.

Premise 
After losing his job on a coin-toss a man concocts a fantastical plan to get rich by harvesting coins from wishing fountains. Aided by his friend and a gentle vagrant, his journey leads to the American highway and an indebted traveler who challenges his notions of wealth and true happiness.

Cast 
 Shane Callahan as Miles
 Anna Stromberg as Penelope
 Cullen Moss as Jack
 Don Henderson Baker as Durwood
 Nick Basta as Shane
 Audrey Speicher as Melissa
 Jane McNeill as Penelope's Mother
 John Stafford as Eli
 Nate Panning as Hans

Production 
After qualifying for the now-defunct North Carolina Film Incentive 25% refund, Well Wishes entered principal photography in October 2013 with a 29-day schedule and 65 shooting locations. The production crew consisted largely of University of North Carolina School of the Arts graduate filmmakers and the cast was filled out with veteran regional actors.

Release 
The film premiered at the Hollywood Film Festival on September 24, 2015 and screened at a dozen film festivals across the United States, including in juried competition at the San Diego Film Festival and the Napa Valley Film Festival. Well Wishes won Best Narrative, Best Director, Best Actress and Best Screenplay at the Williamsburg International Film Festival in Brooklyn, NY. After garnering offers from Gravitas Ventures and several mid-level distributors the film was independently released on digital platforms and Netflix on May 10, 2016 and July 1, 2016, respectively.

References

External links 

Well Wishes at Rotten Tomatoes

2015 films
Films shot in North Carolina
American directors
American comedy films
2015 comedy films
2015 directorial debut films
2010s English-language films
2010s American films